Viradouro is a municipality in the state of São Paulo in Brazil. The population is 19,017 (2020 est.) in an area of 218 km². The elevation is 528 m.

References

Municipalities in São Paulo (state)